Ptilotus manglesii, commonly known as pom poms is a herb native to Western Australia. The Noongar name for the plant is mulla mulla.

It flowers between September and January producing pink flowers. It has a distribution from the Mid West, Wheatbelt, Peel and South West  regions where it grows in sandy or gravelly soils.

The species was first described by the botanist Robert Brown in 1810 as Trichinium macrocephalum in Prodromus Florae Novae Hollandiae, it was renamed by John Lindley in 1839 to Trichinium manglesii.
Reclassified by Ferdinand von Mueller to Ptilotus manglesii in 1868 in the work Fragmenta Phytographiae Australiae.

References

External links
Australasian Virtual Herbarium: Occurrence data for Ptilotus manglesii

manglesii
Eudicots of Western Australia
Taxa named by John Lindley